The Langbathseen are two mountain lakes (Vorderer Langbathsee  and Hinterer Langbathsee) in Upper Austria's part of the Salzkammergut,  from Ebensee. Its excellent visibility makes the Vorderer Langbathsee a popular diving site.

References 

Lakes of Upper Austria